Elsie Coh(e)n (later Elsie Kellner; 14 June 1895 – 26 January 1972) was a Dutch-born British entrepreneur who opened the first art cinema in the UK. She had a try at what is now the Windmill Theatre for six months before opening The Academy cinema in Oxford Street in 1931.

Life
Cohen was born in Amsterdam in 1895. She was educated in England at Queens College.

She joined the cinema industry as a journalist in 1915 when she worked for Kinematograph Weekly. She became really interested in cinema as an art form especially when she interviewed D. W. Griffith for Kinematograph Weekly in 1916. He was publicising his feature-length silent film Intolerance. In 1919 she became a publicist for the Dutch "Hollandia film-making company". In 1921 her boss, Maurits Binger, directs the Dutch film Sister Brown (in Dutch: Zuster Brown). One of the actors is Elsie Cohen. She stayed at that Dutch company until the owner died, returning to the UK to be the floor manager during the filming of the 1928 film "His House in Order".

In 1929 she is credited with creating the first art-house cinema. She heard that the Palais de Luxe in the West End was to be remodelled to create the Windmill Theatre. She rented the cinema before this took place. She screened foreign films and for six months in 1929 successfully put on a highbrow season of recent Russian and German films. Cohen had to surrender that building and another was not immediately available but in 1931 she opened Academy Cinema in Oxford Street with the support of the owner Erik Hakim. Stuart Davis had already approached Eric Hakim, the owner of the Picture House, but Hakim wanted too big a rent. However, Cohen persuaded Hakim to let her manage the cinema, and it opened as "The Academy" in 1931 with Alexander Dovzhenko's Earth ('Zemlya') - one of the last silent films before the 'talkies' took over.

The Academy became the only speciality cinema in London where she would initially show older foreign silent films, but she went on to show foreign films that did have sound and sub-titles. The showings attracted Royalty and celebrities and she had similar facilities at times including the Cinema House in Oxford Circus and later Mayfair's Berkeley Cinema.

She married a Hungarian named Endre (or Andrew), Kellner. He became a British citizen in 1935 and they divorced the following year.

In 1940 her cinema business ended when bomb damage forced the building to close. Her idea would continue but regretfully Cohen was not involved. After the war "The Academy" was run by the film director George Hoellering.

Cohen died at her home in Saltdean in 1972 after a long illness.

Legacy
The sculptor Ronald Moody created a bust of Cohen in 1934-1936 and pictures of it are in the National Portrait Gallery.

References

Sources
 
 

1895 births
1972 deaths
Mass media people from Amsterdam
Film exhibitors
Dutch film actresses
People from Saltdean
Dutch emigrants to the United Kingdom